Onkar K. Ghate (born 1965 or 1966) is a Canadian philosopher. He is an Objectivist and a senior fellow and chief philosophy officer at the Ayn Rand Institute.

Education and career 
Ghate studied economics and philosophy at the University of Toronto, graduating with a Bachelor of Arts degree in 1990. He then earned a Master of Arts in philosophy in 1992 and a Doctor of Philosophy in 1998 at the University of Calgary. He is a Canadian citizen of German and Indian descent.

After working in the financial industry, Ghate began working at the Ayn Rand Institute in 2000, being appointed as dean and instructor to its recently launched Objectivist Academic Center. In 2007 he became a senior fellow at the Institute, and in 2013 became the Chief Content Officer. He has been a contributing author to several books on Ayn Rand's fictional works and her philosophy, among them "Essays on Ayn Rand's Atlas Shrugged" and Why Businessmen Need Philosophy. He is the author of "A Teacher's Guide to the Signet Edition of Atlas Shrugged by Ayn Rand".

Ghate has contributed articles to The Huffington Post, Fox News, CNN, and BusinessWeek. He has also made television and radio appearances on outlets such as NPR, BBC Radio, Fox News, CNBC and CBS. Ghate has given many talks to academic audiences, such as at Stanford University, the University of California, Los Angeles, and the University of California, Irvine.

See also 
 American philosophy
 Ethical egoism
 Free market
 Objectivist movement
 Philosophical realism
 Rational egoism

References

External links

21st-century Canadian non-fiction writers
Canadian academics
Canadian male journalists
Canadian people of German descent
Canadian people of Indian descent
Living people
Objectivism scholars
Objectivists
People from Irvine, California
University of Calgary alumni
University of Toronto alumni
Year of birth uncertain
Ayn Rand Institute
Year of birth missing (living people)